Matt Haimovitz  (born December 3, 1970)  is a cellist based in the United States and Canada. Born in Israel, he grew up in the US from the age of five. He plays mainly a cello made by Matteo Goffriller in 1710.

Family, musical education and early career
Matt Haimovitz was born in the Israeli town of Bat Yam as son of Meir and Marlena Haimovitz, a Jewish couple who moved to Israel from Romania. When he was 5 years old, the family settled in Palo Alto, California.

Haimovitz began to study the cello at the age of seven with Irene Sharp in California. At the age of nine, he switched teachers to Gábor Reitő. When Haimovitz was twelve years old, Itzhak Perlman, who was impressed by his performances at a music camp in Santa Barbara, introduced him to Leonard Rose. In order for him to study with Rose at the Juilliard School, his family moved to New York in 1983. Haimovitz attended high school at Collegiate School (New York City) on the Upper West Side. Rose described Haimovitz as "probably the greatest talent I have ever taught", praising his "ravishingly beautiful tone" and "unusual sense of style and musical sensitivity".

In February 1985, Haimovitz joined Zubin Mehta and the Israel Philharmonic Orchestra in a concert which was filmed and broadcast. This success was followed in 1986 by an American tour with Mehta and the Israel Philharmonic, as well as concerts with the New York Philharmonic. In the same year Haimovitz was awarded an Avery Fisher Career Grant for exceptional musical achievement, the youngest musician to receive this award. Over the next decade, Haimovitz appeared with many of the major orchestras of North America, Europe and Asia, and worked with the most distinguished conductors.  In 1987, at the age of 17, Haimovitz signed an exclusive recording contract with Deutsche Grammophon Gesellschaft, where several of his recordings of standard and non-standard repertoire won international awards.

Recent career
After graduating from Harvard College in 1996, and with the termination of his contract with Deutsche Grammophon, Haimovitz became dissatisfied with the traditional career path of a modern classical musician.  He began exploring non-standard classical and non-classical repertoire more intensively, and began a program of concerts in unusual venues.  A 2002 North American tour that attracted international attention saw Haimovitz performing Bach's cello suites in night clubs, restaurants and other highly untraditional venues in a wide variety of towns and cities across the United States.  This was followed in 2003 by Haimovitz's Anthem tour, in which he brought a variety of American compositions to a similar variety of audiences, including his rendition of Jimi Hendrix's famous improvisational rendition of "The Star-Spangled Banner."

In 2000, Haimovitz founded his own record label, Oxingale with partner and wife, composer Luna Pearl Woolf, which has released CD recordings of his own recital programs, as well as music performed by others. In 2010 this label expanded to include a music publishing branch, which features works commissioned, performed, and recorded by Haimovitz.

"Shuffle. Play.Listen", his 2-disc collaboration with pianist Christopher O'Riley in 2011, was hailed for its innovation in mixing together Bernard Hermann film scores, Janácek, and Cocteau Twins. "The idea behind it is to blast away at any and all categories...", wrote Richard Ginell of the L.A. Times.

From 1999 to 2004, Haimovitz was a faculty member at the University of Massachusetts in Amherst, Massachusetts.  Since 2004, he has taught at the Schulich School of Music of McGill University in Montreal as well as the Domaine Forget academy for the arts in rural Quebec.

In June 2013, Haimovitz went on an international tour to Italy performing with the Palo Alto Chamber Orchestra. He also recorded Philip Glass' Cello Concerto No. 2 with Dennis Russell Davies and the Cincinnati Symphony; the concerto is a reworking of the film score ''Naqoyqatsi''.

From 2015 Oxingale and PENTATONE record label have joined forces and formed the PENTATONE Oxingale Series, re-releasing old albums - now also digitally available and distributed worldwide - and producing new ones.  In 2015, Haimovitz released two recordings on PENTATONE using period instruments: the cello sonatas of Ludwig van Beethoven, with pianist Christopher O'Riley; and a second recording of Bach's cello suites (on Haimovitz's earlier traversal, recorded in 2000, he had used a modernized cello and bow).

Discography

References

Further reading

Notes

External links
Haimovitz official biography
Matt Haimovitz Interview
Oxingale records
Hear Matt Haimovitz in concert from WGBH boston
"Redefining Success, Off the Beaten Track - Cellist Matt Haimovitz, Bringing Bach to the Bar Band Stage" - review by Richard Scheinin in "San Jose Mercury News, 4.20.2005
Discography on Deutsche Grammophon
BACH & friends Documentary 
Artist representation on National Public Radio

1970 births
Living people
Harvard College alumni
University of Massachusetts Amherst faculty
American cellists
American people of Romanian-Jewish descent
American classical cellists
Israeli Jews
Israeli classical cellists
Israeli people of Romanian-Jewish descent
Israeli emigrants to the United States
Deutsche Grammophon artists
Jewish classical musicians
People from Bat Yam